Idalija Bėčienė (born 1953) is a Lithuanian interior designer and architect. She is noted for her work with polychrome, with projects such as Vilnius City Hall (1995-2000), the Lithuanian Presidential Palace and the Great Hall (1998), the Church of Jesus Christ of God and Šešuolėliai Manor. In Vilnius she has also restored a 19th century villa with Rūta Valainienė and Elena Kazlauskaitė. She is a member of the Lithuanian Chamber of Architects.

References

Lithuanian architects
Lithuanian designers
1953 births
Living people
Date of birth missing (living people)
Place of birth missing (living people)